Lansing Robert Pilch is a United States Air Force major general who serves as the Director of Air and Cyberspace Operations of the Pacific Air Forces. Previously, he was the Commander of the 380th Air Expeditionary Wing.

References

External links

Year of birth missing (living people)
Living people
People from Stockton, New Jersey
Place of birth missing (living people)
United States Air Force generals
Military personnel from New Jersey